The water polo events at the 1986 World Aquatics Championships were held from 13 to 23 August 1986, in Madrid, Spain.

Medal summary

Medal table

Medalists

References

 
1986
World Aquatics Championships
Water polo